Lee Hyun-jung (born October 23, 2000) is a South Korean professional basketball player for the Santa Cruz Warriors of the NBA G League. He played college basketball for the Davidson Wildcats of the Atlantic 10 Conference (A-10).

Early life and background
Lee's mother, Sung Jung-a, won a silver medal while representing South Korea in basketball at the 1984 Summer Olympics. His father, Lee Yoon-hwan, played semi-professionally before becoming a high school athletic director and coach, while his older sister, Lee Ri-na, played for the South Korean under-16 national team.

In middle school, Lee was only 170 centimeters and played as a guard, making him practice dribbling and mid-range shooting. By the end of his middle school years, Lee grew to over 190 centimeters. He played as a center during defense and a guard during the offense. From his performance in middle school games, Lee was selected as a South Korean men's national basketball team in FIBA Asia Under-16 Championship. He averaged 14 points and 5.7 rebounds per game, leading his team to its first gold medal.

High school career
Lee attended Samil Commercial School in Suwon, where he played basketball under the coaching of his father. Afterwards, he was selected to the 2016 FIBA Under-17 World Championship and beat China in the round of 16. Lee faced United States in the quarterfinals, and got eliminated from the tournament. After experiencing the world stage, Lee was invited to the Asian Pacific team camp organized by NBA, where he was selected as the Camp All-Star and is offered admission at the NBA Global Academy. In 2018, he enrolled at the NBA Global Academy in Canberra, Australia. Lee learned to speak English while attending the academy. He modeled his game after Klay Thompson. 

Lee struggled initially at the NBA Global Academy, but he managed his grades well and adapted well to the academy. In 2018, he scored 26 points, 10.3 rebounds, and 6 assists per game in the U18 Asian Basketball Championship.

After the tournament, Lee performed well at the G-League showcase and received offers from 20 U.S. universities while managing SAT scores well. Lee decided to enter Davidson College, where Stephen Curry came from after the showcase.

Lee committed to playing college basketball for Davidson over an offer from Thompson's alma mater, Washington State. He drew the attention of head coach Bob McKillop and his staff at a Basketball Without Borders event. He would become the fourth player and the second men's player from South Korea to play NCAA Division I basketball.

College career

Freshman year
Lee started the year playing a sixth man role by playing 20.9 minutes per game. On February 7, 2020, he scored a freshman season-high 20 points in a 73–62 loss to VCU. As a freshman, Lee averaged 8.4 points and 3.1 rebounds per game. He was a two-time Atlantic 10 Rookie of the Week and earned All-Rookie Team honors.

Sophomore year
He started from the opening game against High Point on November 25, 2020. In the season opener, Lee played as a starter, leading the team to victory with a success rate of 57.1% and 50% with 23 points, 5 rebounds, 9 assists, and 2 blocks. His defense showed considerable improvement, as Lee blocked more shots than his first year. Also, as the main guard graduated, Lee's ball possession increased, and the assist rate increased significantly.

Lee's stat line for the season in Davidson College was an average of 13.5 points, 4 rebounds, 2.5 assists, 50.3% field goals, 43.6% three-point success rate, and 90.5% free throws success rate. He got into the 180 club, which was the 10th time in NCAA since Davidson's 92-93 season.

Junior year
In the NCAA opening game against Delaware on November 10, 2021, he contributed to a great victory in the opening game with 15 points, 5 rebounds, 5 assists, 1 block, scoring three 3 pointers.

In a match against the University of San Francisco on November 14, he scored 11 points, 9 rebounds, and 2 assists. Still, his shot sense was not very good, with only one successful shot throwing four three-point shots.

In a match against the East Carolina University on November 21, he showed good performance with 25 points, 10 rebounds, scoring five 3 pointers, including a double-double in scoring career-high.

He led the team to victory with 23 points, 3 rebounds, and 4 assists against Robert Morris on November 28. He has clearly established himself as an ace in the team with over 20 points in two consecutive games. He is expanding his scoring route, including mid-range jumpers and under-the-goal scoring as well as three-point shots.

He broke his career high once again against Charlotte on December 1. With 32 points and 14 rebounds, he recorded a double-double once again following the match against East Carolina, and his three-point success rate was also 50%.

On December 22, Lee scored 17 points, 4 rebounds, 3 assists, and 4 three-point shots (4/8) against Alabama, the 10th-ranked basketball team in the U.S., leading his team to a thrilling victory by 1 point. It is the first time in 13 years that Davidson College has won against a team within the top 10 in the U.S. since 2008 when Stephen Curry played.

On April 26, 2022, Lee declared for the 2022 NBA Draft forgoing his remaining college eligibility. He then suffered a foot injury and went undrafted.

Professional career

Santa Cruz Warriors (2023–present)
After going undrafted in the 2022 NBA draft, on February 20, 2023, Lee was acquired via waivers by the Santa Cruz Warriors.

National team career
Lee played for South Korea's junior national team at the 2015 FIBA Asia Under-16 Championship. He averaged 14 points and 5.7 rebounds per game, leading his team to its first gold medal at the tournament. Lee represented South Korea at the 2016 FIBA Under-17 World Championship and led the 2018 FIBA Under-18 Asian Championship in scoring, assists and steals. He was named to the senior national team for the 2022 FIBA Asia Cup qualification as well as the 2020 FIBA Men's Olympic Qualifying Tournaments.

Player profile
His position is a swingman who can play shooting guard and small forward, and his ability to take three-pointers is very accurate, which makes him a sharpshooter. In his sophomore year, Lee had a field goal percentage of 50.3%, a three-point success rate of 43.6%, and a free throw success rate of 90.5%. It is characterized by a shooting form that takes a relatively fast release. The accuracy of catch and shot is considered a huge advantage, and his off-the-ball movement is above average in his division. Lee has a tendency to score with three-point catch and shoot and cut-in.

At the beginning of the second year, he scored more than 10 points in each game with his major offensive route, off-the-ball cut-in, and catch-and-shot. But he struggled in some games due to his opponent's physical intensive checks in the middle. Lee also increases the proportion of other attack options such as mid-range and drive-in.

Career statistics

College

|-
| style="text-align:left;"| 2019–20
| style="text-align:left;"| Davidson
| 28 || 0 || 20.9 || .467 || .377 || .857 || 3.1 || .8 || .6 || .1 || 8.4
|-
| style="text-align:left;"| 2020–21
| style="text-align:left;"| Davidson
| 22 || 22 || 29.9 || .508 || .442 || .900 || 4.0 || 2.5 || .5 || .4 || 13.5
|-
| style="text-align:left;"| 2021–22
| style="text-align:left;"| Davidson
| 34 || 33 || 32.1 || .474 || .381 || .777 || 6.0 || 1.9 || .7 || .3 || 15.8
|- class="sortbottom"
| style="text-align:center;" colspan="2"| Career
| 84 || 55 || 27.8 || .481 || .397 || .823 || 4.5 || 1.7 || .6 || .2 || 12.7

References

External links

Davidson Wildcats bio

2000 births
Living people
Davidson Wildcats men's basketball players
Expatriate basketball people in Australia
People from Seongnam
Shooting guards
Small forwards
South Korean expatriate sportspeople in Australia
South Korean expatriate basketball people in the United States
South Korean men's basketball players
Sportspeople from Gyeonggi Province